John Odin Wentworth Watson  (born 25 January 1937), is an Australian politician. He was a Liberal member of the Australian Senate from 1978 to 2008, representing the state of Tasmania. From July 2005 until he left parliament in June 2008, he was the Father of the Senate.

Watson was born in Launceston and educated at the University of Tasmania, where he graduated in economics and accountancy. He was a chartered accountant, company director and lecturer in accountancy before entering politics.

Watson was a member of the Coalition Shadow Ministry from 1990 to 1994 but never held ministerial office. He was however one of the Senate's leading experts on taxation and superannuation matters and is highly regarded by his Coalition colleagues. He was expected to announce his retirement at the 2007 election, but decided to apply for preselection, despite being 70 years of age.

On 12 May 2007, Watson was defeated in his bid for preselection after his decision to recontest sparked anger within the party.

References

External links
Watson dumped from Liberal Party senate ticket from ABC News Online
 

1937 births
Living people
Liberal Party of Australia members of the Parliament of Australia
Members of the Australian Senate
Members of the Australian Senate for Tasmania
Members of the Order of Australia
21st-century Australian politicians
20th-century Australian politicians